IVM (Indus Vox Media) Podcasts is an Indian multi-lingual podcast network founded in 2015 that hosts a wide variety of podcasts, including Cyrus Says, featuring Cyrus Broacha. IVM also featured celebrity Abhishek Bachchan on a football podcast. Also, Shashi Kapoor's son Kunal Kapoor and his son Zahan Kapoor had been a part of a podcast on the theatre.

History 
It was founded on 8 March 2015, by Amit Doshi and co-founded by Kavita Rajwade.

IVM Podcasts produces and hosts a variety of podcasts across genres such as sports, entertainment, lifestyle, and business. Some of their popular podcasts include Cyrus Says, The Seen and the Unseen, The Habit Coach with Ashdin Doctor, Football Shootball, and Advertising is Dead.

Cyrus Says is a comedy podcast hosted by Cyrus Broacha, where he interviews celebrities and discusses various topics. The Seen and the Unseen is a policy and economics podcast hosted by Amit Varma, where he examines complex issues through the lens of liberty and individual rights. The Habit Coach with Ashdin Doctor is a self-improvement podcast where Doctor shares tips and tricks to help listeners build better habits. Football Shootball is a podcast about Indian football, while Advertising is Dead is about advertising and marketing.

IVM Podcasts has played a significant role in promoting podcasting in India and has been instrumental in creating a thriving podcasting community in the country.

References

External links 

 
 YouTube channel

Podcasting companies
2015 podcast debuts
YouTube podcasters